A CD or compact disc is a thin plastic silvery disc for audio recordings.

CD or cd may also refer to:

Science and technology

Astronomy and cosmology
 Cordoba Durchmusterung, a star catalog of the southern sky
 Cosmological decade or CÐ, a unit of time
 Type-cD galaxy, a galaxy morphology classification

Biology, ecology, and medicine
 Coeliac disease, long term autoimmune disorder causing intolerance to gluten
 Conduct disorder, a psychological disorder
 Conservation Dependent or LR/cd, an IUCN category
 Cluster of differentiation, a protocol used for the identification of cell surface molecules on white blood cells
 Crohn's disease
 Chlordane
Communicable disease

Computing
 CD-ROM, compact disc technology applied for use in computer data
 cd (command), a command line command to change the current working directory in operating systems
 continuous delivery, a software development design practice
 continuous deployment, a software development design practice 
 collision detection, CSMA/CD

Mathematics
 cd (elliptic function), one of Jacobi's elliptic functions

Other uses in science and technology
 Cadmium, symbol Cd, a chemical element
 Candela or cd, a unit of light intensity
 -CD, the North American call sign suffix for Class A low-power television stations operating with digital signals
 Circular dichroism, a form of spectroscopy
 Critical Dimension, the minimum feature size that a projection system can print in photolithography
 Drag coefficient or cd, a dimensionless quantity used to quantify the drag of an object in a fluid
 Cluster decay, a rare mode of nuclear decay

Businesses and organizations

Government, military, and political
 Canadian Forces' Decoration, by post-nominal letters
 Centre Democrats (Denmark), a Danish former political party
 Centre Democrats (Netherlands), a former political party of the Netherlands
 Centro Democratico, a political party in Italy
 Christian democracy, a political ideology
 Civil defense, an effort to protect the citizens of a state from military attack and natural disasters
 Community of Democracies, an intergovernmental organization of democracies and democratizing countries
 Conference on Disarmament, an international forum that negotiates multilateral arms control and disarmament agreements
 Corps Diplomatique, the collective body of foreign diplomats accredited to a particular country or body
 FBI Counterintelligence Division, the United States Federal Bureau of Investigation's division responsible for investigating espionage

Other business and organizations
 Certificate of deposit, a bank account in the United States with a fixed maturity date
 České dráhy or ČD, a railway operator of the Czech Republic
 Commander of the Order of Distinction, a rank in the Jamaican Orders of Societies of Honour

Places
 Central District, Seattle, a district in Seattle
 Democratic Republic of the Congo, by ISO 3166-1 alpha-2 country code
 .cd, the Internet domain of the Democratic Republic of the Congo
 cd., abbreviation for caddesi, street, in Turkish

Other uses
 400 (number), written CD in Roman numerals
 205 (number), written CD in hexadecimal
 AD 400 (CD), a year of the Common Era
 "CD", a song by T2 (band)
 Geely CD, a coupe automobile made by Geely Automobile
 Cairo Damascus or Damascus Document, a text found among the Dead Sea Scrolls
 Committee Draft, a status in the International Organization for Standardization
 Companion dog (title), a title offered to dogs by the American Kennel Club for dog obedience
 Cross-dressing, the act of wearing clothing associated with the opposite sex
 Corendon Dutch Airlines (IATA code)
 Sega Mega-CD
 Sonic CD

See also

 
 CDS (disambiguation)
 CeeDee (disambiguation)
 C&D (disambiguation)